Erucastrum is a genus of flowering plant in the family Brassicaceae. There are approximately 18 species. Erucastrum species are known generally as dogmustards.

Species include:
 Erucastrum gallicum
 Erucastrum nasturtiifolium
 Erucastrum rostratum

References

Brassicaceae
Brassicaceae genera
Taxonomy articles created by Polbot